Grinning Cat is a full-length album from electronic artist Susumu Yokota, released in 2001.

Track listing
 "I Imagine" – 2:34
 "King Dragonfly" – 4:42
 "Card Nation" – 4:00
 "Sleepy Eye" – 2:44
 "Lapis Lazuli" – 3:49
 "Balloon in the Cage" – 1:02
 "Cherry Blossom" – 5:25
 "Love Bird" – 3:49
 "Fearful Dream" – 4:10
 "Tears of a Poet" – 4:36
 "So Red" – 3:23
 "Flying Cat" – 5:52
 "Lost Child" – 3:26

References

External links
 

Susumu Yokota albums
2001 albums